Boris Ignatievich Arvatov (Russian: Борис Игнатьевич Арватов; 3 June 1896, Vilkaviškis – 14 June 1940) was a Russian and Soviet artist and art critic. He was active in the constructivist movement.

His father was a specialist in customs law. He had two brothers - Yuri Arvatov (1898–1937) and Vadim Arvatov.

Arvatov was involved with the Institute of Artistic Culture (INKhUK) when it was founded in 1920 and was an active theorist and ideologist of the Proletkult. Here he met fellow theorists Osip Brik, Boris Kushner and Nikolai Tarabukin with whom he developed the productivist approach to the role of the 'artist', which they wanted to be orientated towards a more industrial approach aimed at producing socially useful objects.

He was one of the founders of LEF.

Art and Production
Art and Production was published in Russian in 1926. An amended version translated into German as Kunst und Prodiktion was published in Munich in 1972. Spanish and Italian translations appeared in 1973. An English translation was published in 2017.

In 1940 he committed suicide after spending ten years in a psychiatric sanatorium.

References

1896 births
1940 suicides
Russian art critics
Artists from Kyiv
1940 deaths
Suicides in the Soviet Union